The 1949 New Zealand general election was a nationwide vote to determine the shape of the New Zealand Parliament's 29th term. It saw the governing Labour Party defeated by the opposition National Party. This marked the end of the First Labour government and the beginning of the First National government.

Background
The Labour Party had formed its first ministry after winning the 1935 election, and had remained in power (with gradually decreasing majorities) since then. The National Party, formed by a merger of the parties which Labour had originally ousted, gradually increased its power in Parliament; the ineffectual Adam Hamilton was replaced by Sidney Holland, and internal disputes were gradually resolved. The Prime Minister, Peter Fraser, was increasingly weary. Ongoing shortages after World War II also eroded public support for the government. The National Party's decision not to repeal Labour's social welfare policies also increased its appeal.

MPs retiring in 1949
Two Labour MPs and one National MP intended to retire at the end of the Parliament.

The election
The date for the main elections was a Wednesday 30 November. Elections to the four Māori electorates were held the day before—the 1949 elections were the last in which Māori voted on a different day. 1,113,852 people were registered to vote, although rolls for the Māori electorates were "woefully inadequate." Voter turnout for the elections is disputed, given the problems with the Māori roll—some sources place it at 93.5 percent, while others estimate 92.9 percent. Regardless, the turnout was relatively high for the time. The number of seats being contested was 80, a number which had been fixed since 1902.

Election results

Party standings
The 1949 election saw the governing Labour Party defeated by a twelve-seat margin. It has previously held a four-seat majority. Labour won a total of 34 seats, as opposed to National's 46. The popular vote was considerably closer—Labour won 47.2 percent to National's 51.9 percent. No seats were won by minor party candidates or by independents.

Votes summary

Initial MPs

The table below shows the results of the 1949 general election:

Key

|-
 |colspan=8 style="background-color:#FFDEAD" | General electorates
|-

|-
 | Hauraki
 | style="background-color:;" |
 | colspan=3 style="text-align:center;background-color:;" | Andy Sutherland
 | style="text-align:right;" | 3,944
 | style="background-color:;" |
 | style="text-align:center;" | Percival Peacock
|-

|-
 |colspan=8 style="background-color:#FFDEAD" | Māori electorates
|-

|}

Table footnotes:

Notes

References

 
November 1949 events in New Zealand